

Israel or Palestine
 Wadi Ara, Haifa , formerly Khirbet es Zebadneh (as on SWP map 8)
 Khirbat al-Zababida, SWP map 10
 Zababdeh, SWP map 12